When My Ship Comes In is a 1934 short film featuring Betty Boop. The phrase may also refer to:
"When My Ship Comes In", a song by Clint Black from his album The Hard Way
"When My Ship Comes In", a song by Jeff Watson from his album Around the Sun